Medline Industries, LP is a private American healthcare company headquartered in Northfield, Illinois. In June, 2021 it was acquired by a consortium of private equity firms Blackstone, Carlyle and Hellman & Friedman valuing the company at $34 billion in one of the largest leveraged buyouts of all time. It is the nation's largest privately held manufacturer and distributor of medical supplies providing products, education, clinical programs and services across the continuum of care with operations in over 125 countries.

In 2021, Medline had sales of $20.2 billion. Medline is ranked at #17 on the Forbes 2021 list of largest privately held companies in America and employs over 28,000 people.

History

In 1910, A.L. Mills established the Northwestern Garment Factory making aprons for stock yards. In 1912, A.L. Mills established Mills Hospital Supplies Inc., making surgical gowns and nurses uniforms for hospitals. In the 1920s, A.L.’s son, Irving, took over the business and began distributing general medical supplies in addition to the garments. In 1961, Irving sold the company to Cenco. In 1966, A.L.’s grandsons Jim and Jon Mills left Cenco and founded Medline with approximately 12,000 square feet of warehouse space and one loading dock in Evanston, IL. In 1968, Medline opened its first textile manufacturing facility in Covington, Ind. In 1972, Medline opened its first non-textile manufacturing division (Dynacor) with the purchase of an injection molding company. 

In 1995, Medline opened its first facility for assembling Sterile Procedure Trays (SPT) in Waukegan, IL. In 1996, Medline entered the distribution business. In 2001, Medline started manufacturing private label wound care products for CVS, Walgreens, Target, Dollar General and Family Dollar. In April 2007, Medline acquired the Curad brand of first-aid products, from Beiersdorf, entering the retail market. The Curad brand includes products such as bandages, surgical tape, and liquid bandage.

In 2009, Medline Launched Generation Pink exam gloves to help raise breast cancer awareness and turned the original Pink Glove Dance video into a viral breast cancer awareness campaign, reaching 14+ million people. In 2011, Medline introduced BioMask, the first-ever FDA-cleared antiviral medical facemask shown to inactivate flu viruses. 

Today, Medline Industries, LP offers over 550,000 medical products and clinical solutions to hospitals, extended care facilities, surgery centers, physician offices, home care agencies and providers, and retailers. Its 28,000 employees extend to over 90 countries (such as USA, Canada, Mexico, Spain, Germany, United Kingdom, France, Italy, Japan, Australia and New Zealand) and include clinicians, researchers, engineers, financial experts and 2,000 direct sales representatives. Medline operates 43 U.S. distribution centers. Medline partners with UiPath, ABBYY, and other OCR and RPA companies.

Labor relations

In over 50 years of doing business, Medline has had several charges filed against it with the National Labor Relations Board. In late September 2015, Medline terminated a warehouse operator at its Shepherdsville, Kentucky, distribution facility. The terminated employee alleged that Medline terminated him due to his alleged protected labor organizing activities. Medline settled with this employee for $15,000 on condition that the employee not return to work; this agreement was approved by the Region 9 director, Garey Lindsay, on January 26, 2016.  Medline admitted in a Notice to Employees that:

References

External links 
 

Companies based in Cook County, Illinois
Northfield, Illinois
Health care companies based in Illinois
Health care companies established in 1966
1966 establishments in Illinois